Edward Gould (January 8, 1874 – May 13, 1937) was an American golfer. He competed in the men's individual event at the 1904 Summer Olympics.

References

External links
 

1874 births
1937 deaths
Amateur golfers
American male golfers
Olympic golfers of the United States
Golfers at the 1904 Summer Olympics
Golfers from St. Louis